The 1934 Saskatchewan general election was held on June 19, 1934, to elect members of the Legislative Assembly of Saskatchewan.

The Liberal Party of former Premier James Gardiner was returned to power with a large majority – 50 of the 55 seats in the legislature – after the four year Conservative minority government interlude.

After forming a coalition government to oust the Liberals from power after the 1929 election, James T.M. Anderson's Conservative government had tried to use anti-Catholic and anti-French Canadian feeling in the province to win support. The Conservatives also had the support of the Ku Klux Klan, which was a significant force in the province at the time. The Tories also had to contend with the effects of the Great Depression and the Prairie dust bowl, however; and although they won about a quarter of the popular vote, they won no seats in the legislature. The Conservatives remained a minor force in Saskatchewan politics for 40 years after this defeat.

The Tories' allies in the previous legislature – the Progressives – did not nominate candidates in this election, and were replaced by Farmer-Labour candidates as the voice of the Left in the province.

Results

|- bgcolor=CCCCCC
!rowspan=2 colspan=2 align=center|Party
!rowspan=2 align=center|Party leader
!rowspan=2|Candidates
!colspan=3 align=center|Seats
!colspan=3 align=center|Popular vote
|- bgcolor=CCCCCC
|align="center"|1929
|align="center"|Elected
|align="center"|% Change
|align="center"|#
|align="center"|%
|align="center"|% Change

|align=left|Liberal
|align="center"|James Gardiner
|align="right"| 56
|align="right"|28
|align="right"| 50
|align="right"|+78.6%
|align="right"|206,212
|align="right"| 48.00%
|align="right"|+2.44%

|align="center"|M.J. Coldwell
|align="right"| 54
|align="right"|*
|align="right"| 5
|align="right"|*
|align="right"|102,944
|align="right"|23.96%
|align="right"|*

|align=left|Conservative
|align="center"|James Anderson
|align="right"| 52
|align="right"|24
|align="right"| –
|align="right"|-100%
|align="right"|114,923
|align="right"|26.75%
|align="right"|-9.69%

| colspan=2 align=left|Independent
|align="right"| 3
|align="right"|6
|align="right"| –
|align="right"|-100%
|align="right"|2,949
|align="right"|0.69%
|align="right"|-8.37%

|align="center"|William G. Baker(default)
|align="right"| 1
|align="right"|*
|align="right"| –
|align="right"|*
|align="right"|1,420
|align="right"|0.33%
|align="right"|*

|align="center"|
|align="right"| 3
|align="right"|*
|align="right"| –
|align="right"|*
|align="right"|1,053
|align="right"|0.24%
|align="right"|*

| colspan=2 align=left|Independent Liberal
|align="right"| 1
|align="right"|–
|align="right"| –
|align="right"|–
|align="right"|133
|align="right"|0.03%
|align="right"|-0.29%
|-
|colspan=3| Total
|align="right"| 169
|align="right"|63
|align="right"| 55
|align="right"|-12.7%
|align="right"|429,634
|align="right"|100%
|align="right"| 
|-
| align="center" colspan=10|Source: Elections Saskatchewan
|-

Note: * Party did not nominate candidates in previous election.

Percentages

Ranking

Riding results
Names in bold represent cabinet ministers and the Speaker. Party leaders are italicized. The symbol " ** " indicates MLAs who are not running again.

Northwestern Saskatchewan

Northeastern Saskatchewan

|style="width: 130px"|Liberal
|Jim King
|align="right"|4,540
|align="right"|72.20%
|align="right"|+6.34%

|Joe Burton
|align="right"|1,748
|align="right"|27.80%
|align="right"|-6.34%
|- bgcolor="white"
!align="left" colspan=3|Total
!align="right"|6,288
!align="right"|100.00%
!align="right"|

West Central Saskatchewan

East Central Saskatchewan

|style="width: 130px"|Liberal
|E. Walt Gerrand
|align="right"|Acclaimed
|align="right"|100.00%
|- bgcolor="white"
!align="left" colspan=3|Total
!align="right"|Acclamation
!align="right"|

Southwest Saskatchewan

|style="width: 130px"|Liberal
|Edward Culliton
|align="right"|3,312
|align="right"|68.90%
|align="right"|+14.91%

|Frank Keem Malcolm
|align="right"|1,495
|align="right"|31.10%
|align="right"|+13.00%
|- bgcolor="white"
!align="left" colspan=3|Total
!align="right"|4,807
!align="right"|100.00%
!align="right"|

Southeast Saskatchewan

Urban constituencies

| style="width: 130px"|Liberal
|William Franklin Kerr (incumbent)
|align="right"|11,883
|align="right"|65.58%
|align="right"|–

|Independent
|Denis Sweeney
|align="right"|6,236
|align="right"|34.42%
|align="right"|–
|- bgcolor="white"
!align="left" colspan=3|Total
!align="right"|18,119
!align="right"|100.00%
!align="right"|

See also
List of Saskatchewan political parties
List of Saskatchewan provincial electoral districts

References

Saskatchewan Archives Board - Election Results By Electoral Division
Elections Saskatchewan - Provincial Vote Summaries

Further reading
 

1934 elections in Canada
1934 in Saskatchewan
1934
June 1934 events